MX Linux is a Linux distribution based on Debian stable and using core antiX components, with additional software created or packaged by the MX community. The development of MX Linux is a collaborative effort between the antiX and former MEPIS communities. The MX 'name' comes from the M for MEPIS and the X from antiX - an acknowledgment of their roots. The community's stated goal is to produce "a family of operating systems that are designed to combine elegant and efficient desktops with high stability and solid performance". 

MX Linux uses Xfce as the main desktop environment, to which it adds a free-standing KDE Plasma version and, in 2021, a stand-alone Fluxbox implementation. Other environments can be added or are available as "spin-off" ISO images.

History 
MX Linux began in a discussion about future options among members of the MEPIS community in December 2013. Developers from antiX then joined them, bringing the ISO build system as well as Live-USB/DVD technology. To be listed on the Linux distribution clearinghouse website DistroWatch, MX Linux was initially presented as a version of antiX. It received its own DistroWatch page with the release of the first public beta of MX-16 on November 2, 2016.

The MX-14 series was based on Debian Stable "Wheezy", using Xfce 4.10 and then, with the 14.4 release, Xfce 4.12. The MX-14 versions were intended to fit onto a CD, which limited the number of applications that could be included. This series saw the gradual evolution of the MX Tools, a collection of utilities to help users with common tasks that are often complicated and obscure.

MX-15 moved to the new Debian Stable "Jessie" using systemd-shim, meaning that systemd is installed but the default init is sysvinit. The size limitation was lifted, enabling the developers to present a full turnkey product. There was a substantial expansion of MX Tools.

MX-16 was still based on Debian Stable "Jessie", but with many applications backported and added from other sources. There were further refinements to MX Tools, the import of advanced antiX developments, expanded support, and a completely new icon/theme/wallpaper collection.

MX-16.1 collected all bug fixes and improvements since MX-16, added a new kingfisher theme, upgraded and streamlined MX Tools, revised documentation, and added new translations.

MX-17 changed its base to Debian 9 (Stretch) and brought upgraded artwork, new MX Tools, improved Live operation via antiX and other changes.

MX-18 continued the development of MX Tools, introduced a new kernel, enabled whole disk encryption, and added GRUB themes, splash functionality through MX Boot options artwork, and improved localization.

MX-19 upgraded its base to Debian 10 (Buster) and its default desktop to Xfce 4.14. It is characterized by new and revised Tools, artwork, documentation, localization, and technical features.

MX-21 was released on October 21, 2021. It is based on Debian 11.0 (Bullseye) and is available as Xfce, KDE or Fluxbox versions. Details in the MX Blog.

MX-21.1 was released on April 9, 2022. It is based on Debian 11.3 (Bullseye) and is available as Xfce, Xfce AHS, KDE, and Fluxbox versions. Disk Manager returns and for share settings, MX Samba Config app (GUI) is included. Further details are in the MX blog.

MX-21.2 was released on August 28, 2022. It is based on Debian 11.4 (Bullseye) and is available as Xfce, KDE, Xfce AHS, and Fluxbox versions. Further details are in the MX blog.

MX-21.2.1 was released on September 18, 2022. It is based on Debian 11.5 (Bullseye) and is available as Xfce, Xfce AHS, KDE, and Fluxbox versions. Includes Debian's recent Grub-PC updates. Further details are in the MX blog.

MX-21.3 3rd refresh of MX-21, was released on January 14, 2023. Based on Debian 11.6 with bug fixes, new kernels, and many application updates. Available as Xfce (4.18), Xfce AHS, KDE, and Fluxbox versions. Further details are in the MX blog.

Desktop environments 
MX Linux has four desktop editions:

 'Xfce' is a fast and medium-low resource default desktop environment. 32-bit and 64-bit versions are available. Revision 4.18 was released on December 15, 2022. This update from 4.16 will be sent out to MX 21.x users mid-January '23.

 'Fluxbox' a version with very low resource usage. This edition first released on October 21, 2021.  32-bit and 64-bit versions are available.

 'KDE' a 64-bit only version. KDE is an Advanced Hardware Support (AHS) version of MX featuring the KDE/Plasma desktop and currently features a long-term supported Linux 5.10.x kernel.  This edition was first released on August 16, 2020.

 'AHS'  a 64-bit only version. (Advanced Hardware Support) with newer graphics drivers, 5.18 kernel (or newer) and firmware for very recent hardware (AMD Ryzen/Radeon RX graphic cards, or 9th/10th/11th generation Intel CPU).

Recent Releases 

A table of current MX Linux Development Team supported releases and how long Debian will provide Long Term Support.

Features 
MX Linux has basic tools like a graphic installer that handles UEFI computers, a GUI-based method to change a Linux kernel and other core programs. 

It includes MX Tools, a suite of user-oriented utilities, many of which were developed specifically for MX, while some were forked from existing antiX applications or are existing antiX applications; a couple were imported with permission from outside sources. These tools are also available in Debian Stable-based Linux distributions, and some of the main tools are as follows: 

 Live-USB Kernel Updater

 Live USB Maker

 RemasterCC

 Snapshot

 Boot Options

 Boot Repair

 Cleanup

 FormatUSB

A particularly popular one is MX-snapshot, a GUI tool to remaster a live session or installation into a single .ISO file. The "cloned" image is bootable from a disk or USB flash drive, maintaining all settings, allowing an installation to be completely backed up, and/or distributed with minimal administrative effort since an advanced method of copying the file system (developed by antiX-Linux) uses bind-mounts performing the "heavy lifting".

System requirements

Minimum
 8.5 GB hard disk space for installation. 
 1 GB RAM for i386 and AMD64 architectures.
 Bootable CD-DVD drive or a USB stick.
 A modern i686 Intel or AMD processor.

Recommended
 20 GB of hard disk space, SSD for faster performance.
 2 GB of RAM.
 modern i686 Intel or AMD processor. Multi-core for good performance.
 3D-capable video card for 3D desktop support.
 SoundBlaster, AC97 or HDA-compatible sound card.
 For use as a LiveUSB, 8 GB free if using persistence.

See also 

 antiX
 MEPIS

References

External links 

 
 
 MX Linux support forum
 MX Linux support group on facebook
 A full list of substantive reviews, both written and video, that are known to MX Linux developers can be found with summaries on the this page.
 The complete feature list can be seen on this page. 

2014 software
Computer-related introductions in 2014
Debian-based distributions
Linux distributions
Linux distributions without systemd
X86-64 Linux distributions